Charles Shaw (born July 4, 1960) is an American rapper and singer who, in 1988, performed on recordings credited to Milli Vanilli.

Controversy
Shaw, a U.S. Army veteran, was reportedly paid $6,000 to perform the rap on Milli Vanilli's hit single "Girl You Know It’s True". In December 1989, Shaw disclosed to New York Newsday writer John Leland that he was one of three singers on Milli Vanilli's hit debut album, and that Milli Vanilli frontmen Rob Pilatus and Fabrice Morvan were impostors.  Milli Vanilli producer Frank Farian reportedly paid Shaw $150,000 to retract his statements.

Morvan and Pilatus went on to win the Grammy Award for Best New Artist on February 22, 1990, but rumors about Shaw's involvement persisted. Eventually, the true story of Milli Vanilli was exposed later that year, when Farian broke the story himself, and the duo's Grammy Award was withdrawn.

Farian re-launched the group in 1991 as The Real Milli Vanilli, using Shaw with Brad Howell and John Davis, the singers from the original studio sessions.  This group lasted for one album, The Moment of Truth. A revised version of this album was later released in the United States with the group renamed Try N B.

In August 1998, Shaw was arrested in Cologne, Germany as part of an embezzlement investigation. Shaw had been sought for allegedly pocketing money that was meant to be invested in a 1996 Real Milli Vanilli tour of Hungary.

New recordings
In 1994, Shaw released the single "I'm Feeling" featuring vocals of Sandra Chambers and in 1995 the single "Gotta Fever". In 2000 he released an updated version.

References

External links
Milli Vanilli biography via MTV.com

Milli Vanilli
1960 births
Living people
American fraudsters
American rappers
United States Army soldiers
21st-century American rappers